Something Happened is Joseph Heller's second novel (published in 1974, thirteen years after Catch-22). Its main character and narrator is Bob Slocum, a businessman who engages in a stream of consciousness narrative about his job, his family, his childhood, his sexual escapades, and his own psyche. Although Something Happened failed to achieve the level renown of renown that Catch-22 did, it has since developed a cult following, with some considering it one of Heller's finest works.

Plot

While there is an ongoing plot about Slocum preparing for a promotion at work, most of the book focuses on detailing various events from his life, ranging from early childhood to his predictions for the future, often in non-chronological order and with little if anything to connect one anecdote to the next. Near the end of the book, Slocum starts worrying about the state of his own sanity as he finds himself hallucinating or remembering events incorrectly, suggesting that some or all of the novel might be the product of his imagination, making him an unreliable narrator.

Reception
Something Happened has frequently been criticized as overlong, rambling, and deeply unhappy. These sentiments are echoed in a review of the novel by Kurt Vonnegut Jr., but are balanced with praise for the novel's prose and the meticulous patience Heller took in the creation of the novel, stating, "Is this book any good? Yes. It is splendidly put together and hypnotic to read. It is as clear and hard-edged as a cut diamond. Mr. Heller's concentration and patience are so evident on every page that one can only say that 'Something Happened' is at all points precisely what he hoped it would be." In a contemporary write-up for Kirkus Reviews, the reviewer states that "there is none of the rogue absurdism or imaginative verve" of Heller's previous novel, but praises the book's "bravura, expertise and cumulative hook".

Something Happened has since garnered a small base of devoted fans. In 2015, Carmen Petaccio referred to it as the "most criminally overlooked great novel of the past half century [...] one of the most pleasurable, engrossing, and in retrospect moving American novels ever written." Naturi Thomas-Millard called it the "best book you've never read"; while agreeing that it is overlong, she billed it as "an invaluable study in how to portray the horror of everyday life." Novelist Jonathan Franzen prefers Something Happened to Catch-22, and Christopher Buckley referred to the work as "dark and brilliant". Comedian Richard Lewis claims he "happily lost most of [his] hope" after reading the novel.

References

External links 
Kurt Vonnegut on 'Something Happened' from The New York Times Book Review (1974).

1974 American novels
Novels by Joseph Heller
Alfred A. Knopf books
Fiction with unreliable narrators
Books with cover art by Paul Bacon
Bureaucracy in fiction